NGC 1265 is a Fanaroff and Riley class 1 radio galaxy located in the constellation Perseus, a member of the Perseus Cluster.

References

External links
 
 Simbad NGC 1265
 3CRR Atlas 3C 83.1B

Radio galaxies
Elliptical galaxies
083.1B
1265
02651
12287
Perseus (constellation)
Perseus Cluster
012287